Jason Wells (born 18 February 1984 in Griffith, New South Wales, Australia), is an Australian former professional rugby league footballer who last played for the Newtown Jets in the New South Wales Cup.

Wells had previously played in the NRL for the Manly-Warringah Sea Eagles and Toulouse Olympique in France. He had also played for the NSW Residents representative team.

References

External links
Newtown Jets profile

1984 births
Living people
Australian rugby league players
Manly Warringah Sea Eagles players
Newtown Jets NSW Cup players
Rugby league locks
Rugby league players from Griffith, New South Wales
Toulouse Olympique players